Sartekeh-ye Sofla (also Romanized as Sārtekeh-ye Soflá; also known as Sārdekeh-ye Pā‘īn) is a village in Kani Sur Rural District, Namshir District, Baneh County, Kurdistan Province, Iran. At the 2006 census, its population was 34, in 7 families. The village is populated by Kurds.

References 

Towns and villages in Baneh County
Kurdish settlements in Kurdistan Province